The Tasmanian State League (TSL), colloquially known as the "Tasmanian Football League (TFL)" (formerly known as the "Tasmanian Australian National Football League (TANFL)" and several other short-term names) is the highest ranked Australian rules football league in Tasmania, Australia.

The league has a long and convoluted history which dates back to its founding on 12 June 1879 as the Tasmanian Football Association (giving it some claim to the title of the third oldest club football league in the world), but the name "TFL" (also the state's football governing body) was removed after it was liquidated with crushing debts in February 1999 and replaced by an independent commission (Football Tasmania) and the competition was renamed the Tasmanian State Football League (1999) and the SWL (2000) until the number of clubs in financial difficulty made the league unsustainable and it collapsed in December 2000. After long negotiations and discussions it was reinstated as a ten club competition in 2009.

History

Post war years
In 1944, the Tasmanian Australian National Football League (TANFL) directors met to discuss restructuring of the league which was scheduled to return in 1945 after three seasons in recession due to World War II. The clubs would represent their various districts rather than being individual clubs.

Two new clubs (Hobart & Sandy Bay) would join North Hobart and New Town at the expense of Cananore and Lefroy which went out of existence during the World War II cessation.

In 1947 the TANFL voted to include a further two clubs (Clarence –formed in 1903– and New Norfolk –formed in 1878–) from the Southern District Football Association for a three-year probationary period. On 7 August 1950, the clubs unanimously voted to retain the two clubs as permanent members of the competition.

At the end of the 1956 season, New Town FC relocated itself to the municipality of Glenorchy and absorbed the already existing local club Glenorchy Rovers; on 8 April 1957 the TANFL ratified the club's new name as "Glenorchy District Football Club", its new home ground was the 1950-built KGV Park.

This era would be the strongest one for the league with a succession of star players in its ranks, record crowds and huge public support.

From 1979 to 1985 the TANFL would be known as the "Winfield League" under a naming-rights sponsorship arrangement with a tobacco company.

Statewide Football era: 1986-2000

Disbandment

The league disbanded due to a dwindling of clubs able to financially cope and fell under the umbrella of Football Tasmania (which was soon renamed AFL Tasmania).

Three regional leagues absorbed the clubs from the Statewide League. This was represented by the 2 main north–south leagues and subsidiary regional leagues which underpinned the Tasmanian Devils VFL team, created in 2001 which was owned and funded by the Australian Football League and administered by AFL Tasmania.

Tasmanian State League
After a hiatus of eight years, AFL Tasmania announced plans for a return of the statewide league in 2009.

The concept attracted widespread public and media debate on the return of a statewide competition, with many in the football world hesitant over such a move due to the perilous financial position most of the participating clubs were left in after the previous competition was disbanded in 2000. 
Many believed the push for a return of the league was a direct result of the media and the Tasmanian State Government's strong campaign in getting a Tasmanian team admitted into the AFL.

Under the AFL Tasmania plan, ten (10) clubs were invited to join the competition.

Clarence, Glenorchy, Hobart and North Hobart along with former Southern amateur club Lauderdale in the South. North Launceston, South Launceston and Launceston from the North and Devonport and Burnie Dockers from the North-West Coast.

The response from many clubs was initially lukewarm at best with many concerned at the lack of detail in the AFL Tasmania plan and the rushed decision-making process of the move.

Ulverstone from the North West Coast bowed to pressure from its playing list and some factional groups within the club to put in a submission to join the competition in 2009. Despite a membership vote narrowly ending in favour of joining, the Robins had missed the AFL Tasmania enforced deadline and were initially to be included in the 2010 roster, however the remaining clubs (most notably its closest and most bitter rival Devonport) exerted considerable pressure upon the League not to alter the current makeup of teams for a period of ten years, therefore Ulverstone were excluded from joining.

SFL Premier League club Kingborough also lobbied AFL Tasmania to be included in the competition, but their case for inclusion was dismissed by the game's governing body due to their inadequate facilities and poor standard Kingston Beach Oval headquarters. Former TFL club New Norfolk (1947–1999) was also not invited to join the league because of their poor financial position. Also, as a result of the new competition getting off the ground, the Tasmania Devils VFL team was disbanded.

On 4 April 2009, the opening match of the reformed competition took place at King George V Park between the reigning premiers of the SFL Premier League, Glenorchy and reigning NTFL premier Launceston and resulted in a 21-point triumph to the Blues.

The inaugural Grand Final was held at Bellerive Oval on 19 September between old rivals Glenorchy and Clarence resulting in a thrilling 6-point victory to the Roos in front of 7,534 fans.

The 2010 season started brightly with over 12,000 attending the first round of matches but soon after there was a great deal of off-field controversy with former Tasmanian Premier Paul Lennon originally accepting an unpaid role acting as a mediator between the clubs and AFL Tasmania as the relationship between the clubs and the governing body had become further strained. However, after only two weeks of the season, three clubs (Clarence, North Launceston and North Hobart) had decided to do their own bidding and Lennon walked away from the position.

There were further controversies, namely AFL Tasmania's decision to withdraw support for the Reserve grade competition after the Burnie Dockers announced only days before the start of the season that they would not be fielding a reserve grade side. Two other clubs (Hobart and Launceston) also struggled to field a reserves team throughout the season, and as a result the competition was run by the clubs themselves for the remainder of the season. It would be axed at season's end.

A finals set-up that included an extra week was roundly criticised by football pundits across the State and it failed to garner great enthusiasm amongst the footballing public as small crowds attended, with AFL Tasmania later admitting that they would be looking at returning to the more tradition Final Five set-up in 2011.

During the 2013 season, South Launceston decided that it would not pursue a new TSL licence at the end of the season, and arranged to move into the newest Northern Tasmanian Football Association in 2014; despite this, the club went on to win the 2013 premiership, meaning that there was no defending premier in 2014. The club was replaced by the Prospect State Football Club, which competes under the formal club name of Western Storm Football Club. At the same time, the North Hobart Football Club was forced to disband as a team by AFL Tasmania in favour of the newly established Hobart City Football Club, whilst the Hobart Tigers left for the Southern Football League. These movements were forced upon the league to make space for a new AFL Tasmania backed TSL club, the Kingborough Tigers Football Club.

Prior to 2016, the Western Storm was rebranded as the Prospect Hawks; but it was unable to field a senior team in 2016, managing only to field an uncompetitive team in the reserves, before being expelled from the league at the end of the 2016 season. Prior to 2018, both north-western clubs – Burnie and Devonport – found themselves unable to viably field teams in the competition, with withdrew, reducing the size of the competition to seven teams.

On 9 October 2017 the paying members of the Hobart City Demons voted 371–118 in favour of returning the playing name of the club to the North Hobart identity for season 2018 and beyond.

Clubs
The Tasmanian Football League operates on a single table system, with no divisions, conferences nor promotion and relegation from other leagues.

Current Clubs

Notes

Locations

Past clubs

TFA/STFA/TANFL: 1879–1941

TANFL/TFL Statewide League: 1945–2000

TSL State League: 2009–2017

Notes

League Presidents

Premierships, leading goalkickers and records 

Since the first championship held in 1879, North Hobart has won the most premiers with 27 titles. The first champion ever was City FC, a club now defunct.

Timeline (1945–present)

Individual awards

Alastair Lynch Medal Winners
Formerly known as the Tassie Medal, presented to the Best and Fairest player in the Tasmanian State League from 2009.

Peter Hudson Medal Winners
Presented to the Leading Goalkicker in the Tasmanian State League from 2009.

Former Individual Awards

Wilson Bailey Trophy Winners
It was presented to the best and fairest player in the TFL/TANFL from 1927 until 1929. It was replaced by the William Leitch Medal in 1930.

George Watt Medallists
It was presented to the best and fairest player in the TANFL from 1935 until 1939. It replaced the William Leitch Medal although it ended up being replaced by it in 1940

William Leitch Medal

The William Leitch medal was presented to the best & fairest player in the TANFL/TFL Statewide League from 1930 to 1934 and 1940–2000.
As of 2009 when the Tasmanian State League was revived, AFL Tasmania decided to award the Tassie Medal to the best and fairest player in the revamped competition as it was seen (particularly in the North) that the William Leitch medal was too Hobart-centric.
The medal continues to be presented to the best and fairest player in the Southern Football League since 2004.

Audience

Media

Official Magazine
Currently there is no official magazine for games during the 2014 season. A new provider and TSL Record is currently being re-designed for the 2015 season and beyond through Tall Zebra Media.

Television
Currently Southern Cross Seven shows one game a week on Saturday afternoons. Previously ABC and WIN broadcast the league.

All Tasmanian based stations have news and results shown regularly in their news broadcasts. Southern Cross report full-time scores from the TFL as well as other leagues around the state during the half time break of their Saturday night AFL broadcast.

Radio
League matches were formerly broadcast on radio from 1931 to 2000, however there are currently no radio broadcasts of TFL football with the exception of the Grand Final and the occasional roster game on ABC Local Radio which is also streamed online.

Newspapers
The Hobart Mercury in the South, The Examiner in Launceston and the North as well as The Advocate on the North West Coast all provide extensive coverage of TSL football in their publications.

Attendance
The Tasmanian Football league crowds compete heavily with AFL matches on television. Crowds at the beginning of the season are usually quite high and are up with the mainland state football competitions. Attendances usually slide considerably until it will increase during the finals. Night games, especially ones that do not clash with AFL matches are well attended.

Patrons at TFL games pay at the gates or hold club season passes.

See also
 Australian rules football in Tasmania
 Northern Tasmanian Football League
 Southern Football League (Tasmania)

References

External links
 Official website
 AFL Tasmania
 Southern Football League Website
 Northern Tasmanian Football League
 2008 Tasmanian Football Hall of Fame Inductions

 
Australian rules football competitions in Tasmania
1879 establishments in Australia
Sports leagues established in 1879
Professional sports leagues in Australia